Superjail! is an American adult animated television series produced by Williams Street. It follows the events that take place in an unusual prison. The pilot episode aired on television on May 13, 2007, and its first season began on September 28, 2008 on Cartoon Network's late night programming block, Adult Swim.

Superjail! is characterized by its psychedelic shifts in setting and plot and extreme graphic violence, which give the series a TV-MA-V rating (for graphic violence, including scenes of bloodshed, dismemberment, torture, and extreme cruelty). These elements are depicted through highly elaborate animated sequences, which have been described as "Baroque and complicated and hard to take in at a single viewing".

Setting and premise
The majority of Superjail! is set inside the eponymous prison, located in an alternate dimension identified as "5612". The prison is overseen by an individual known only as "The Warden", the amiable yet sadistic and mischievous head of Superjail with apparent shapeshifting powers who uses the prison (and prisoners) to satisfy his numerous whims. Externally, Superjail is built underneath a volcano which is itself located inside of a larger volcano. Internally, it seems to constitute its own reality, where the fabric of time and space is fluid and changes at the whim of the Warden. It has been indicated that the prison itself has a degree of sentience and that the nature of the prison is fluid according to the perceptions of the individual. Superjail's inmate population is estimated by Jared, the Warden's primary assistant, to be in excess of 70,000, though the show's creators mention that the prison processes "billions of inmates".

In the first season, each episode begins with a linear story revolving around an irresponsible scheme concocted by the Warden to satisfy some personal desire. The episode builds in both violence and surrealism into a climactic psychedelic blood bath during which dozens of inmates are brutally and gruesomely murdered either by one another or an external force. Some episode plots have no resolutions at all, with the story simply stopping when events have reached their most chaotic. Regardless, the status quo is always restored by the next episode, unless the episode is a multi-part one.

Beginning with the second season, the creators modified the format of the series to focus more on character development and story, as imagined by a revised writing staff. The second-season premiere "Best Friends Forever" demonstrated an immediate break from the first season's template, focusing the episode on Jailbot and Jacknife as opposed to the Warden, setting half of the episode outside of the prison and lacking an extended murder sequence in the climax.

The third season of the show attempted to meld the formats of the first two seasons, continuing a focus on character development and ongoing storylines while reviving the technique of ending each episode with a complex murder sequence.

Production
The series was the creation of Christy Karacas, Stephen Warbrick, and Ben Gruber. Karacas was a member of the band Cheeseburger (who provided the show's theme song "Comin' Home" until season 4), a background designer for MTV's Daria, directed Robotomy for Cartoon Network and later created Ballmastrz: 9009. Stephen Warbrick  was originally known for his work on MTV's Beavis and Butt-Head and Daria, was a digital artist on MTV's Celebrity Deathmatch and was also an animatic artist at Blue Sky Studios. Ben Gruber originally wrote for Ultracity 6060 on MTV's Cartoon Sushi and later wrote for shows like Teen Titans Go!, Breadwinners, and SpongeBob SquarePants, and would later become a story editor for Jellystone!.

Karacas originally created a student film in 1997 for MTV's Cartoon Sushi, entitled "Space War". He then partnered with Stephen Warbrick in 2001, creating another film known as "Bar Fight", which caught the attention of Cartoon Network's Adult Swim, who allowed them, and Ben Gruber, to create a show of their own.

Episodes

International broadcast 
In Canada, Superjail previously aired on G4's Adult Digital Distraction block, and currently airs on the Canadian version of Adult Swim.

Characters

Main
 The Warden (voiced by David Wain) – The proprietor and warden of Superjail and main protagonist of the series. A tall, thin man clad in a purple tailcoat and top hat, gloves, red cummerbund, and yellow-tinted glasses. The Warden has been described as a "sadistic version of both the Mad Hatter from Alice in Wonderland and Willy Wonka from Charlie and the Chocolate Factory". Despite possessing an ever-cheerful and friendly disposition, he's actually a severely deranged and violent sociopath due to his upbringing by his cruel father who was also a warden referred to in the pilot as Prison Moghal. The Warden devised Superjail as a means for expressing himself and regularly endangers the inhabitants of Superjail, often intentionally, to satisfy some unusual whim. He has very little respect for human life, and one day wishes to incarcerate all of humanity within the Superjail, according to one episode depicting an alternate future where he conquers the entire world and transforms it into a single prison state. Rather than handling any actual administrative tasks, he spends most of his time lusting after Chief Guard Alice, a recurring gag poking fun at the Warden’s naivety regarding Alice’s biological sex, or indulging his own bizarre fantasies. The Warden also possesses magical abilities, such as the ability to shapeshift into virtually anything he can imagine, and the ability to control the laws of reality within Superjail. Though the Warden's name is never revealed, David Wain answered "Mark Davis" to a user on Reddit.
 Jared (voiced by Teddy Cohn) – Superjail's large-headed, long-moustached, uptight/high-strung accountant and Warden's primary assistant. Jared handles most of Superjail's administrative duties and extracurricular activities, such as the Superjail Newspaper. He was first taken to Superjail as a prisoner for unknowingly working for the mafia and got his current job when impressing the Warden with his intelligence and financial skills (An allusion to The Shawshank Redemption). He's in recovery for, according to the show's creators, every addiction possible: alcoholism, drug addiction, gambling, and compulsive eating. Periodically, Jared suffers relapses into his addictions, especially when he's stressed out, temptation proves to be too much for him, or is forced by the Warden into a position likely to prompt a relapse (such as serving as a bartender at a bar built inside Superjail).
 Alice (voiced by Christy Karacas) – Superjail's hulking, muscular head prison guard. Alice regularly engages in sadomasochistic rituals with the prisoners (often without their consent), all the while rebuffing the Warden's constant advances. Originally a male guard at a normal prison, she discovered her true nature after falling in love with that prison's homosexual warden, who quickly fired her as a result of his transphobia. Alice was hired by the Warden shortly thereafter. Alice doesn't seem to take hormone therapy, but does have breast implants and publicly considers herself a woman. It's apparent throughout the show that she has not undergone gender reassignment surgery.
 Jailbot – A white, tombstone-shaped, levitating robot that the Warden created to perform tasks in and around Superjail. Within his simplistic-looking body seems to be a limitless storage space, from which he can produce a vast arsenal of deadly weaponry and tools, including numerous telescoping arms. At the beginning of every episode, Jailbot is tasked with capturing and torturing a criminal named Jackknife and bringing him to Superjail, often maiming or killing innocent bystanders in the process. A running gag for the intro in the first three seasons shows Jailbot carrying Jacknife through various other dimensions into a cloud resembling Warden's head which leads to Superjail. In the episode "Jailbot 2.0", the Warden claims that Jailbot single-handedly built the vast prison, but flashbacks suggest that Jailbot is really the latest in a series of similar robots. He's mute, with a dot matrix screen that displays a simple expressive face. Despite his ruthlessness, Jailbot also possesses a childlike personality, protecting the Warden from any harm and watching out for the welfare of young children who come across his path, however, he can be cold and ruthless to children who are mean to him; Christy Karacas described him as a "red-headed stepchild...seeking approval." He has even shown compassion for Jacknife, such as releasing him in "Best Friends Forever".
 The Doctor (voiced by Christopher McCulloch) – The resident physician of Superjail. He regularly experiments on the inmates in grotesque ways and has a German accent, but at times says words in French. It was revealed in "Vacation" that he fought in World War II and was at one point a POW.
 The Twins (voiced by Richard Mather) – Two green-blooded, blonde, identical twin aliens with European-sounding accents who inhabit a laboratory underneath Superjail and wear outfits resembling those worn by the Sandmen in Logan's Run. They took a year abroad trip to Earth and then decided to stay much to their father's chagrin. Their on-screen appearances are accompanied by techno music. The Twins use their alien powers—including teleportation, shrinking, and materializing various items to interfere with the Warden's plans for their amusement. Although their plots often result in mass death and destruction, the Twins do not appear to harbour any malice towards either the Warden or the prisoners.
 Jackknife (voiced by Christy Karacas) – A low-level criminal who appears in the openings of most episodes committing crimes before getting captured and brutally tortured by Jailbot, where his subsequent journey through various "outer worlds" and back to Superjail makes up the opening credits sequence (with the latter being omitted in the 4th and final season). He's often depicted escaping the jail during the murder sequences in the first season and periodically throughout seasons 2 and 3. He never speaks and communicates only by way of animalistic grunts and shrieks. He's labelled by Jared to be Superjail's most vile inmate due to his upbringing and near lack of any form of morality. Jacknife is depicted as being short-tempered, violent, and misogynistic. During the events of Oedipus Mess, Jacknife is revealed to have sired a son with one of Ultra-Prison's inmates. Having recognized the child as his, Jacknife escaped while the Warden created 10,000 clones of Jacknife that ran amok worldwide until all but the original were killed off. In the Season 3 premiere, a female version of Jacknife causes chaos at a male strip club and gets sent to UltraPrison, suggesting that Jacknife either has a sister or a wife.
 Lord Stingray (voiced by Eric Bauza) – A stereotypical supervillain character, akin to Cobra Commander, and the main antagonist of the show. After being defeated by his army-themed enemies, he crash-landed on Superjail Island and tried to take it over, but ended up being imprisoned. He's been a thorn in the Warden's side ever since by trying to either escape or take over Superjail. Lord Stingray first appears in the second season episode "Lord Stingray Crash Party".

Recurring
 Gary and Bird – Gary is a silent, bespectacled man obviously based on Robert Franklin Stroud, the Birdman of Alcatraz. However, Gary is mostly a servant to Bird, a small female canary, who appears to be the unofficial "boss" of all of the prisoners in Superjail until Lord Stingray got imprisoned. In the episode 'Uh Oh, It's Magic,' Gary uses his ventriloquism to throw his voice into the Warden's puppet Prison Peedee to stage a break-out. However, the plan is foiled prior to Gary's vocal cords being surgically removed and discarded.
 Paul Guaye and Jean Baptiste Le Ghei (voiced by Christopher McCulloch, Stephen Warbrick) – Two homosexual inmates that can be seen in nearly every episode. Former leaders of rival "Purple Pythons" (Jean) and "Double Rainbow" (Paul) prison gangs in Superjail, which parodies 1961 musical West Side Story. They fell in love as a result and eventually got married. Paul is depicted as being the more feminine of the couple and is somewhat controlling of Jean. Jean is more of the stereotypical male. Despite being violent criminals, the two of them are actually somewhat kind and caring towards others and are respected by the other inmates.
 Ash (voiced by Christopher McCulloch) – A severely burned pyrokinetic pyromaniac prisoner. His burns come from a fire caused by his father, a drunk, dropping a cigarette in a movie theatre. Ash's personality is almost childlike.
 Fatty (voiced by Stephen Warbrick) – A bald, middle-aged, overweight inmate with a high-pitched voice and giggly/creepy personality, with an affinity for trying to show off his genitals, usually towards Gary. It is revealed in the episode "Superjail Grand Prix" that Fatty is a pedophile. Fatty is often killed during the murder scene or at some point in any episode, he appears in, only to be inexplicably revived for the next episode.
 Peedee (voiced by Dana Snyder) – A live ventriloquist's dummy possessed by Gary's vocal cords. Originally, he was controlled from within by Bird with Gary projecting his voice, but the dummy gained independence after Gary's severed vocal cords first possessed a rat and then the doll, turning it to a foul-mouthed criminal with a mobster accent and a standard inmate status. He shares a rivalry with Lord Stingray, but the two occasionally work together against the Warden and the other inmates.

Ultra-Prison
 The Mistress (voiced by Sally Donovan) – The female warden of Ultra-Prison (a women's prison). She had a brief one-night stand with the Warden while under the effects of Spanish fly. In the season 2 finale, she takes control of Superjail. She engaged in a relationship with Lord Stingray in the season 3 episode "Stingstress". However, after a night of intercourse with Alice, the Mistress returns Superjail to the Warden while she begins a new life-style as a hippie.
Bruce (voiced by Melissa Brown (Ladies' Night) and Chris McCulloch, Stephen Warbrick (Stingstress) – the head guard at Ultraprison and part of the Mistress' staff. He is the opposite counterpart to Alice and is thus also transgender.
Nova (voiced by Sally Donovan) –The pink robot of UltraPrison. While she appears to be the female version of Jailbot, she is also sleeker, refers to herself as 'newer model' than he is however since they both are custom built prototypes no one can be newer or older.
Charise (voiced by Kamala Sankaram ("Ladies' Night") and Sally Donovan in "Vacation" and onwards) – part of the staff at Ultraprison, acting as both Mistress' personal assistant and her accountant. She is the counterpart to Jared.

Influences
In a Cold Hard Flash interview, creator Christy Karacas explained influences for the show were  Gary Panter, Robert Crumb, Sally Cruikshank, Mad, Vince Collins, Looney Tunes, Fleischer Studios, Tex Avery, Bob Clampett, Schoolhouse Rock!, Sesame Street, the Itchy & Scratchy segments from The Simpsons, kids' art, Muppets, outsider art, underground comics and Pee Wee's Playhouse.

Home releases

The series is also available on HBO Max since September 1, 2020.

References

External links

 
 
 
 Superjail! Augenblick Studios
Christy Karacas Exclusive Interview at Staytoonedin
 The Swimcast – interview with Christy Karacas and Stephen Warbrick, November 29, 2012

2000s American adult animated television series
2000s American black comedy television series
2000s American LGBT-related comedy television series
2000s American surreal comedy television series
2010s American adult animated television series
2010s American black comedy television series
2010s American LGBT-related comedy television series
2010s American surreal comedy television series
2007 American television series debuts
2014 American television series endings
American adult animated comedy television series
American flash adult animated television series
English-language television shows
Adult Swim original programming
American prison television series
Fictional prisons
2000s American LGBT-related animated television series
Fiction about murder
Television shows about death
Television series by Williams Street
Television series created by Christy Karacas
Television series set on fictional islands
Gay-related television shows
Transgender-related television shows
2010s American LGBT-related animated television series
2000s American animated television series